The women's high jump event  at the 1990 European Athletics Indoor Championships was held in Kelvin Hall on 3 March.

Results

References

High jump at the European Athletics Indoor Championships
High
1990 in women's athletics